Charles Francis Willis (15 April 1827 – 19 November 1895) was an English amateur cricketer.

Background
The younger son of Charles Willis of Hawkhurst in Kent, Willis was a scholar at Corpus Christi College, Oxford between 1845 and 1853, and a fellow to 1857.  He was rector of Letcombe Bassett, Berkshire from 1856 to 1876, of Church Brampton, Northamptonshire from 1876 to 1879 and of Bassingham, Lincolnshire from 1879 to his death there in 1895.  His brother, William Macbean Willis, was also in holy orders, as curate of Hyde, Kent, then Horsmonden in the same county.  Charles Willis married Rose Anne, daughter of Rev. George Parker Cleather, in 1857; they had two sons and four daughters.

Cricket career
He was mainly associated with Oxford University and Kent, making ten known appearances in first-class matches from 1847 to 1850.

References

1827 births
1895 deaths
English cricketers
English cricketers of 1826 to 1863
Kent cricketers
Oxford University cricketers
People from Hawkhurst
Alumni of Corpus Christi College, Oxford
19th-century English Anglican priests
Gentlemen of Kent cricketers